The New South Wales Minister for Regional New South Wales, Industry and Trade was a minister in the Government of New South Wales who had responsibilities for sponsoring and supporting trade, and international investment in the state of New South Wales, Australia. 

The only Minister was John Barilaro who was also the Deputy Premier of New South Wales. Barilaro was responsible for administering the Regional NSW cluster; and also he supported the Treasurer, Dominic Perrottet, through The Treasury cluster.

In the Regional NSW cluster, Barilaro was assisted by the Minister for Agriculture and Western New South Wales, Adam Marshall. Both ministers were appointed on 2 April 2019. 

Together the ministers administered these portfolios through the Department of Regional NSW.

Ultimately the ministers were responsible to the Parliament of New South Wales.

Former ministerial titles

Minister for Regional New South Wales, Industry and Trade

Minister for Trade and Industry

Minister for Regional New South Wales

See also 

List of New South Wales government agencies

References

Regional New South Wales, Industry and Trade